Live on 5 is the hourly news bulletin produced by Associated Broadcasting Company through ABC News and Public Affairs (now News5) from February 21, 1992, to April 11, 2004, It was replaced by Big News Ngayon.

See also
List of programs aired by TV5 (Philippine TV network)
ABC News and Public Affairs

Philippine television news shows
TV5 (Philippine TV network) news shows
TV5 (Philippine TV network) original programming
1990s Philippine television series
1992 Philippine television series debuts
2004 Philippine television series endings
Filipino-language television shows
English-language television shows